Låt kärleken slå till is a studio album by Bengt Hennings, released in 2009.

Track listing
Jag trodde änglarna fanns
Rena rama vilda västern
Till världens ände
Carina (Jag måste ringa)
I Just Wanna Dance With You
Ovan regnbågen (Over the Rainbow)
Säg inte nej, säg kanske             
Glöm ej bort att älska varann
Muckartwist (instrumental)
En liten gulnad lapp
Men så viskade en fågel
Låt kärleken slå till
Vi har så mycket att säga varandra
Aj, aj, aj
Vår enda sommar

Chart positions

References 

2009 albums
Bengt Hennings albums